Euschoengastia peromysci is a mite in the genus Euschoengastia of the family Trombiculidae. Recorded hosts include the cotton mouse (Peromyscus gossypinus) and marsh rice rat (Oryzomys palustris) in Georgia; the northern short-tailed shrew (Blarina brevicauda), northern red-backed vole (Myodes gapperi), northern flying squirrel (Glaucomys sabrinus), rock vole (Microtus chrotorrhinus), white-footed mouse (Peromyscus leucopus), and deermouse (Peromyscus maniculatus) in Tennessee; and northern red-backed vole, southern bog lemming (Synaptomys cooperi), masked shrew (Sorex cinereus), and eastern red squirrel (Tamiasciurus hudsonicus) in North Carolina, among others.

See also
List of parasites of the marsh rice rat

References

Literature cited
Reeves, W.K., Durden, L.A., Ritzi, C.M., Beckham, K.R., Super, P.E. and O'Connor, B.M. 2007. Ectoparasites and other ectosymbiotic arthropods of vertebrates in the Great Smoky Mountains National Park, USA (abstract only). Zootaxa 1392:31–68.
Wilson, N. and Durden, L.A. 2003. Ectoparasites of terrestrial vertebrates inhabiting the Georgia Barrier Islands, USA: an inventory and preliminary biogeographical analysis (subscription required). Journal of Biogeography 30(8):1207–1220.

Trombidiformes
Animals described in 1929
Arachnids of North America